= Ewe-lamb separation =

Practice of separating lambs and mothers

Ewe-lamb separation is the practice of separating lambs from their mothers in sheep farming. It is a near-universal practice amongst farmers globally. It is usually done within 3-5 months.

== Background ==
The female sheep, or ewe, is typically bred for the first time depends on when she reaches sexual maturity, which can be anywhere from 5-12 months of age. When it is time to wean a lamb, the ewes are moved to another location from where the lambs are kept. Ewes and lambs are kept in separate groups results to increase lambs' feed and water consumption, decreasing weight loss in the lambs in the first few days after weaning. The general rule of thumb is to separate ewes from lambs once the lamb is three times its birth weight. Some lambs are sent to slaughter as soon as they are weaned.

== Early vs late separation ==
Early separation is defined as separating lambs from their mothers before 90 days of age. Early weaning can help lambs reach market weight faster, ease lactation stress in ewes, and allow ewes to be bred sooner. Late weaning (>90 days) results in less stress for the ewe and lambs and less risk of the ewe developing mastitis, and allows the farmers to take advantage of available forage for lambs. Lambs that are weaned late do not need to be separated from ewes.

== Methods ==
=== Abrupt weaning ===
This method of separation involves removing the ewe from a lamb on a specific day. While beneficial for farmers, it can cause significant stress for ewes and lambs if not managed carefully.

=== Gradual weaning ===
Gradual weaning consists of reducing the time lambs spend with their mothers over several days or weeks. This method is less stressful for ewes and lambs but less cost-effective for farmers.

=== Fence-line weaning ===
Like abrupt weaning, this method involves removing the ewe from the lamb on a specific day. The main difference between abrupt weaning and fence-line weaning is that the ewes and lambs are on opposite sides of a fence. This reduces stress while allowing ewes and lambs to see and hear each other after separation.
